Birdwatching is a recreational activity involving the observation of birds.

Birdwatching or Birdwatcher may also refer to:

 Bird Watching (magazine), a British magazine established in 1986
 Birdwatch (magazine), a British magazine established in 1992
 Bird Watching (album), a 1961 album by Don Elliott 
 BirdWatchers, a 2008 film by Marco Bechis
 The Birdwatchers, a garage rock pop band from the 1960s
The Birdwatcher, a 1988 Estonian film by Arvo Iho

See also
 Birdwatch (disambiguation)